Bion (Βίων ) was an ancient Greek bucolic poet from Smyrna, probably active at the end of the second or beginning of the first century BC.  He is named in the Suda as one of three canonical bucolic poets alongside Theocritus and Moschus.  One long poem about Adonis and seventeen shorter fragments of his poetry survive.

Life  

According to the Suda Bion was from Phlossa, which is not otherwise known but may have been one of the villages which made up Smyrna.  Ancient sources do not record Bion's dates or any details about his life, but he likely was active in the late second or early first century BC.  An epitaph to Bion says that he was poisoned and implies that he died young.

Poetry

The Suda and the scholiast on the Palatine Anthology name Bion alongside Theocritus and Moschus as a bucolic poet; he also wrote erotic poetry.  His surviving work comprises the "Lament to Adonis" and seventeen shorter fragments.  All his surviving poetry is composed in dactylic hexameter and in a Doric dialect, which is typical of ancient bucolic poetry.  The Lament to Adonis is 98 lines long; the other fragments are shorter, ranging from a single line to eighteen lines long, and totalling around another 100 lines.  One of these fragments, about a bird hunter's attempt to hunt Eros, is probably a complete poem.  The remaining fragments seem to come from at least four further poems; no two fragments are certainly from the same poem.

Bion's work continued to be read until the sixth century AD, and was alluded to by ancient poets including Meleager of Gadara, Ovid, Catullus, and Nonnus.  The Greek novelists Achilles Tatius, Longus, and Heliodorus also reference Bion.

Bion's longest poem, the Lament to Adonis, is preserved on two medieval manuscripts, was first attributed to him by Joachim Camerarius in 1530.  The first sixteen fragments were preserved by Johannes Stobaeus; the seventeenth fragment was preserved by Orion of Thebes.

References

Works cited

Further reading

External links

 
 
 

Ancient Greek bucolic poets
Poets of ancient Ionia
Ancient Smyrnaeans
Smyrniote Greeks
Ancient Greek poets
2nd-century BC poets
Year of birth unknown
Year of death unknown
Hellenistic poets